Roberts is a village in St. Croix County, Wisconsin, United States. The population was 1,651 at the 2010 census. The village is surrounded by the town of Warren.

History
Roberts was named in 1873 for John Bannister Gibson Roberts, the chief engineer for the West Wisconsin Railroad. A post office called Roberts has been in operation since 1884.

Geography
Roberts is located at  (44.983807, -92.553790).

Demographics

2010 census
At the 2010 census, there were 1,651 people, 625 households and 442 families in the village. The racial makeup of the village was 94.5% White, 1.4% African American, 0.4% Native American, 1.5% Asian, 0.2% Pacific Islander, 0.7% from other races, and 1.3% from two or more races. Hispanic or Latino of any race were 2.1% of the population.

There were 625 households, of which 41.1% had children under the age of 18 living with them, 52.0% were married couples living together, 11.5% had a female householder with no husband present, 7.2% had a male householder with no wife present, and 29.3% were non-families. 21.9% of all households were made up of individuals, and 5.2% had someone living alone who was 65 years of age or older. The average household size was 2.64 and the average family size was 3.09.

The median age was 31.3 years. 29.5% of residents were under the age of 18; 7% were between the ages of 18 and 24; 35.6% were from 25 to 44; 22% were from 45 to 64; and 5.7% were 65 years of age or older. The population was 50.5% male and 49.5% female.

2000 census
At the 2000 census, there were 969 people, 392 households and 255 families residing in the village. The racial makeup of the village was 97.94% White, 0.10% African American, 0.52% Native American, 0.41% Asian, 0.31% from other races, and 0.72% from two or more races. Hispanic or Latino of any race were 0.93% of the population.

There were 392 households, of which 33.2% had children under the age of 18 living with them, 48.7% were married couples living together, 10.5% had a female householder with no husband present, and 34.7% were non-families. 25.8% of all households were made up of individuals, and 5.6% had someone living alone who was 65 years of age or older. The average household size was 2.47 and the average family size was 3.00.

24.9% of the population were under the age of 18, 11.6% from 18 to 24, 35.3% from 25 to 44, 21.7% from 45 to 64, and 6.6% who were 65 years of age or older. The median age was 32 years. For every 100 females, there were 99.8 males. For every 100 females age 18 and over, there were 100.6 males.

The median household income was $42,258 and the median family income was $47,857. Males had a median income of $35,968 compared with $23,819 for females. The per capita income for the village was $19,616. About 3.5% of families and 5.5% of the population were below the poverty line, including 4.2% of those under age 18 and 21.2% of those age 65 or over.

Education
St. Croix Central Elementary School is in Roberts. St. Croix Central Middle and High Schools are in the neighboring community of Hammond.

See also
 List of villages in Wisconsin

References

External links

 
 St Croix Central School District

Villages in St. Croix County, Wisconsin
Villages in Wisconsin